Ervin Zukanović (born 11 February 1987) is a Bosnian professional footballer who plays as a centre-back for Super League Greece club Asteras Tripolis.

Zukanović started his professional career at Željezničar. After leaving the club, he had short spells with Austria Lustenau II, Velež, Sulzberg and Uerdingen 05, before settling in Belgium, where he played for Dender, Eupen, Kortrijk and Gent. In 2014, he was loaned to Chievo. The following year, Zukanović was transferred to Sampdoria. One year after, he switched to Roma, who loaned him to Atalanta in 2016 and to Genoa in 2017. A year later, he signed permanently with Genoa. In 2019, Zukanović joined Al Ahli. The following year, he signed with SPAL. Later that year, he moved to Fatih Karagümrük. In 2022, he joined Asteras Tripolis. 

Zukanović made his senior international debut for Bosnia and Herzegovina in 2012, earning over 30 caps until 2019.

Club career

Early career
Zukanović came through youth academy of his hometown club Željezničar. He made his professional debut in 2005 at the age of 18. After leaving the team, he had short spells with mostly lower-league clubs like Austria Lustenau II, Sulzberg and Uerdingen.

In January 2009, he joined Belgian side Dender. On 7 March, he scored his first professional goal against Genk.

In July 2010, he switched to Eupen.

In June 2011, he was transferred to Kortrijk.

In December 2012, he moved to Gent.

Chievo
In June 2014, Zukanović was loaned to Italian team Chievo until the end of season, with an option to make the transfer permanent. He made his official debut for the club on 24 September against Sampdoria. On 26 October, he scored his first goal for Chievo against Genoa.

In June 2015, Chievo exercised their buy option and signed him permanently.

Sampdoria
In July, Zukanović was transferred to Sampdoria for a fee of €2 million plus Fabrizio Cacciatore. He made his competitive debut for the side in UEFA Europa League qualifier against Vojvodina on 30 July. A month later, he made his league debut against Napoli. On 25 October, he scored his first goal for Sampdoria in a triumph over Hellas Verona.

Roma
In January 2016, Zukanović was sent on a six-month loan to Roma for initial €1.5 million, with buy option set at €2.5 million. On 30 January, he debuted officially for the team in a defeat of Frosinone. A month later, Roma effectuated their buy clause and signed him on a contract until June 2019. On 8 March, Zukanović debuted in UEFA Champions League away at Real Madrid.

In July, he was sent on a season-long loan to Atalanta.

Genoa
In July 2017, Zukanović was loaned to Genoa for the remainder of campaign, with an obligatory buy after certain conditions are met. He debuted competitively for the club in a loss to Lazio on 17 September.

In June 2018, Genoa signed him on a three-year contract.

Later stage of career
In August 2019, Zukanović was transferred to Saudi Arabian outfit Al Ahli.

In January 2020, he signed with SPAL.

In August, he joined Turkish side Fatih Karagümrük.

In August 2022, he moved to Greek team Asteras Tripolis.

International career
In October 2012, Zukanović received his first senior call-up to Bosnia and Herzegovina, for 2014 FIFA World Cup qualifiers against Greece and Lithuania. He debuted against the latter on 16 October.

Zukanović was selected in Bosnia and Herzegovina's preliminary squad for the 2014 FIFA World Cup. He failed to join the team, which had a training camp in the United States, due to visa problems. However, he later blamed the Bosnian FA, which subsequently got him dropped from the squad.

He retired from international football on 20 October 2020.

Personal life
Zukanović married his long-time girlfriend Emina in July 2011. Together they have three children, a daughter named Alin and two sons named Armin and Din.

He is a practising Muslim; along with international teammates Ibrahim Šehić, Muhamed Bešić, Armin Hodžić, Izet Hajrović, Sead Kolašinac and Edin Višća he visited a mosque in Zenica during national team concentration.

Zukanović possesses Belgian passport since 2015.

Career statistics

Club

International

References

External links

1987 births
Living people
Footballers from Sarajevo
Bosniaks of Bosnia and Herzegovina
Bosnia and Herzegovina Muslims
Naturalised citizens of Belgium
Bosnia and Herzegovina footballers
Bosnia and Herzegovina international footballers
Bosnia and Herzegovina expatriate footballers
Association football central defenders
FK Željezničar Sarajevo players
FK Velež Mostar players
KFC Uerdingen 05 players
F.C.V. Dender E.H. players
K.A.S. Eupen players
K.V. Kortrijk players
K.A.A. Gent players
A.C. ChievoVerona players
U.C. Sampdoria players
A.S. Roma players
Atalanta B.C. players
Genoa C.F.C. players
Al-Ahli Saudi FC players
S.P.A.L. players
Fatih Karagümrük S.K. footballers
Asteras Tripolis F.C. players
Premier League of Bosnia and Herzegovina players
Austrian Regionalliga players
Oberliga (football) players
Belgian Pro League players
Challenger Pro League players
Serie A players
Saudi Professional League players
Süper Lig players
Super League Greece players
Expatriate footballers in Austria
Expatriate footballers in Belgium
Expatriate footballers in Italy
Expatriate footballers in Saudi Arabia
Expatriate footballers in Turkey
Expatriate footballers in Greece
Bosnia and Herzegovina expatriate sportspeople in Austria
Bosnia and Herzegovina expatriate sportspeople in Belgium
Bosnia and Herzegovina expatriate sportspeople in Italy
Bosnia and Herzegovina expatriate sportspeople in Saudi Arabia
Bosnia and Herzegovina expatriate sportspeople in Turkey
Bosnia and Herzegovina expatriate sportspeople in Greece